Danny Jones (born 1986) is an English musician and member of McFly.

Danny Jones may also refer to:

 Danny Jones (rugby league) (1986–2015), English rugby league footballer
 Danny Jones (film), a 1972 British drama film
 Danny Jones (basketball) (born 1968), retired American basketball player
 Danny Jones (politician) (born 1951), American, best known for serving four terms as mayor of Charleston, West Virginia

See also
 Daniel Jones (disambiguation)
 Dan Jones (disambiguation)
 Jones (surname)